"The dose makes the poison" ( 'only the dose makes the poison') is an adage intended to indicate a basic principle of toxicology. It is credited to Paracelsus who expressed the classic toxicology maxim "All things are poison, and nothing is without poison; the dosage alone makes it so a thing is not a poison." This is often condensed to: "The dose makes the poison" or in Latin, . It means that a substance can produce the harmful effect associated with its toxic properties only if it reaches a susceptible biological system within the body in a high enough concentration (i.e., dose).

The principle relies on the finding that all chemicals—even water and oxygen—can be toxic if too much is eaten, drunk, or absorbed. "The toxicity of any particular chemical depends on many factors, including the extent to which it enters an individual’s body." This finding also provides the basis for public health standards, which specify maximum acceptable concentrations of various contaminants in food, public drinking water, and the environment.

However, there is no linear relationship and chemical toxicity is more complex than merely the acute effects caused by short-term exposure. Relatively low doses of contaminants in water, food, and environment can already have significant chronic effects if there is long-term exposure.

Generally the effects of different doses can be very different at different levels (not only bigger and smaller impacts depending on dose).

See also
Median lethal dose, LD50 , measurement of acute toxicity for a given substance. A table notes the LD50 of water.
Hormesis
 Dose concentration
 Therapeutic index - parallel idea in contemporary pharmacology
Forensic toxicology

Notes

Toxicology
Paracelsus
Phrases